Nacional Potosí is a Bolivian football and basketball team from Potosí. The football team currently plays in the Bolivian Primera División. Founded on 8 April 1942, it plays its home games at Estadio Víctor Agustín Ugarte.

History
Nacional Potosí is one of Bolivia's oldest football clubs, being founded on 8 April 1942. The team has mainly played in the second tier of Bolivian football. In 2004 it came under the ownership of Emilio Alave and the team started to mount a serious promotion challenge, coming close in 2007 when they lost to Aurora in the relegation play-off. Nacional bounced back the following year and won the Copa Simon Bolívar, gaining promotion to the first division. In 2009 Nacional made its debut in the Liga de Fútbol Profesional Boliviano, but the club couldn't survive its first season and was relegated. In 2010, Wilfredo Condori took over as chairman and the side won both the Copa Simon Bolívar and promotion back to the first division. The club played its first ever Copa Sudamericana in 2014. They lost 1-3 on aggregate to Club Libertad of Paraguay in the first round. Celebrating its diamond anniversary in 2017, the side was playing in the first division and the Copa Sudamericana for just the second time in their history.

Stadium

The club plays its home games at Estadio Víctor Agustín Ugarte in Potosí. It has a capacity for 32,000 people.

The stadium was originally called Estadio San Clemente, but was renamed Mario Mercado Vaca Guzmán after some modifications on the structure, including new illumination towers, were made. Newer modifications led ultimately to its actual name.

Located 4,090 metres above sea level, the stadium is one of the highest in the world. It has raised numerous controversies in footballing circles, as its significant altitude affects the absorption of oxygen in the human body, offering considerable advantage to the home team who are more accustomed to such conditions.

Current squad

Rivalries 

The club has a rivalry with the only other first division club in the Potosí Department, Real Potosí. They share the same stadium, and matches between them usually draw lots of attention.

The first match played between the two clubs was in the 2009 Copa Aerosur on 18 January 2009. Real Potosi won 2-1. The first league match between the two clubs was on 19 April 2009, which finished in a 1-1 draw.

Although both clubs were founded in the 20th century, the reason why it took so long for both clubs to meet was because Nacional Potosi had been playing in the lower divisions until 2009. Nacional Potosí have won 18 times, while Real Potosí have only done it 15 times, there were 11 draws.

Achievements

National Honours

First Division – Professional Era: 0
First Division – Semiprofessional Era: 0
Second Division, Copa Simón Bolivar: 2
2008, 2010
Runners-up (1): 2007

Managers

 Víctor Hugo Andrada (2007–09)
 Juan Carlos Paz (May 19, 2012 – March 3, 2013)
 Julio César Baldivieso (March 4, 2013 – Nov 28, 2013)

References

External links 
Ascenso a Primera División 
 Nacional Potosi at Soccerway

Football clubs in Bolivia
Association football clubs established in 1942
1942 establishments in Bolivia